The African striped skink (Trachylepis striata), commonly called the striped skink, is a species of lizard in the skink family (Scincidae). The species is widespread in East Africa and Southern Africa. It is not a close relation to the Australian striped skink, Ctenotus taeniolatus.

Description
T. striata is brown or bronze-coloured with two yellowish stripes that run lengthwise on either side of the spine. Their tails are often missing due to predators.

Geographic range and subspecies
Former subspecies T. s. punctatissima, T. s. sparsa, and T. s. wahlbergii have been elevated to species level.

References

External links
Striped Skink, Destination Kruger Park

Further reading
Boulenger GA (1887). Catalogue of the Lizards in the British Museum (Natural History). Second Edition. Volume III. ... Scincidæ ... London: Trustees of the British Museum (Natural History). (Taylor and Francis, printers). xii + 575 pp. + Plates I-XL. (Mabuia striata, pp. 204–205; Mabuia wahlbergii, pp. 205–206).
Branch, Bill (2004). Field Guide to Snakes and other Reptiles of Southern Africa. Third Revised edition, Second impression. Sanibel Island, Florida: Ralph Curtis Books. 399 pp. . (Mabuya striata, pp. 156–157 + Plate 54).
Peters W (1844). "Über einege neue Fische und Amphibien aus Angola und Mozambique ". Bericht über die zur Bekanntmachung geeigneten Verhandlungen der Königlich Preussischen Akademie der Wissenschaften zu Berlin 1844: 32–37. (Tropidolepisma striatum, new species, pp. 36–37). (in German).

Trachylepis
Skinks of Africa
Reptiles described in 1844
Taxa named by Wilhelm Peters
Lizards of Africa
Reptiles of South Africa